Diskovibrator is the sixth studio album by the Finnish industrial metal band Turmion Kätilöt, released on 28 September 2015.

Track listing

References 

2015 albums
Turmion Kätilöt albums